Allan Creer (born 12 November 1986) is a Scottish footballer who plays as a goalkeeper. He last played for Ross County.

He joined Alloa from Albion Rovers in January 2006, in direct exchange for Gary McGlynn, having previously played for Dundee United, Livingston and Wishaw Juniors F.C. Following a match in March 2007, Creer was disciplined by his club for reacting to fans after a 4–0 defeat by opponents Stirling Albion.

Creer was released by Alloa in January 2008 and then signed a short-term deal with Ross County in February 2008. He played in four league games, but was heavily criticised for his performance in a 4–2 defeat by Ayr United. He did not play again for Ross County and was released at the end of the 2007–08 season.

He then had spells at Kilsyth Rangers, Hill of Beath Hawthorn and Lanark United before retiring in 2010.

References

External links

Allan Creer profile on Alloa Athletic's official site
Allan Creer profile on Forfar Athletic's official site

1986 births
Scottish footballers
Living people
Albion Rovers F.C. players
Alloa Athletic F.C. players
Livingston F.C. players
Ross County F.C. players
Association football goalkeepers
Sportspeople from Rutherglen
Scottish Football League players
Forfar Athletic F.C. players
Kilsyth Rangers F.C. players
Hill of Beath Hawthorn F.C. players
Lanark United F.C. players
Footballers from South Lanarkshire